The 12th National Games of China were held in the northeastern province of Liaoning from 31 August to 12 September 2013. Liaoning was the sixth provincial level host of the games, following Beijing, Shanghai, Guangdong, Jiangsu and Shandong. A total of 350 events in 31 sports were held at the games.

Host bidding
For the second time in the games' history, the selection of the host province/municipality in 2013 was made on the basis of bidding process (similar to the process undertaken to select the Olympic Games host city). The sports secretaries and officials from every province, municipality and autonomous region cast their votes in a secret ballot. The winning entry must receive a majority of the votes cast.

In the 12th National Games bidding process, Liaoning, Tianjin, Zhejiang and Hubei were the candidates. Each committee made a 20-minute presentation to the officials. In the first round of voting, Hubei with the lowest number of votes at 2 was eliminated while Liaoning received the highest at 38. In the second and final round, Liaoning won in a landslide victory with 43 votes with Tianjin and Zhejiang at 24 and 11 votes, respectively.

The Lioaning organisers settled on a blue and white harbor seal called Ningning as the official mascot for the games. The harbor seal is a frequent sight in Liaodong Bay as it is the country's only nature reserve for the animals.

Venues
A total of 117 facilities were involved in the games, 25 of which were purpose built to host the games. Among them 64 were competition venues and 53 were for training. There was an emphasis on using pre-existing venues for the games and some of the newly developed venues were earmarked for public usage after the competitions. Unlike many other multi-sport events, which typically focus around a host city, the 12th Chinese Games held events in many cities within the host province, Liaoning. Shenyang contained the principal venue, the Shenyang Olympic Sports Center Stadium, where the opening and closing ceremonies were held. Other cities involved in the games were  Anshan, Benxi, Chaoyang, Dalian, Dandong, Fushun, Huludao, Jinzhou, Liaoyang, Panjin, Tieling and Yingkou.

Shenyang Olympic Sports Center Stadium (athletics, opening and closing ceremonies)
Dalian Municipal swimming pool (fencing, modern pentathlon, swimming)
Anshan Olympic stadium (men's football, table tennis)
Anshan Olympic swimming pool (water polo)
Anshan Olympic oval (handball)
Waters near Fushun City People's Square (open water swimming)
Benxi City Stadium (women's basketball)
Benxi City Highway (road cycling)
Dandong City Sports Center Stadium (women's basketball)
Jinzhou Marina Sports Center Stadium (badminton)
Jinzhou International Convention and Exhibition Center Gymnasium (boxing)
Near Shanhai Square, Yingkou (beach volleyball)
Yingkou Olympic Stadium (men's basketball)
Yingkou (marathon)
Fuxin City Stadium (basketball)
Liaoyang City Stadium (wushu, sanshou)
Tieling Normal University Gymnasium (volleyball)
Chaoyang City Stadium (volleyball)
Panjin City Olympic Stadium (women's football, volleyball)
Huludao Olympic Stadium (trampoline gymnastics)

Games

Pre-games events
Although the opening ceremony is scheduled for 31 August 2013, a number of events are scheduled to take place before that date.

The first medals were awarded in the racewalking events, which are part of the athletics programme and were held on 10, 11 and 12 May. Wu Qianlong won the men's 50 kilometres walk and Wang Zhen won the men's 20 kilometre walk. A photo finish was needed for the women's 20 km walk and Lu Xiuzhi was declared the winner ahead of Liu Hong.

Sports
Key: † = New sport

Diving
Swimming
Synchronized swimming
Water polo

 †

Artistic gymnastics
Rhythmic gymnastics
Trampoline gymnastics

 (Sanshou)†

 †

Participation
A total of 9770 athletes from 39 delegations took part in the competition (fewer than both the 2005 and 2009 editions). Among the delegations were 4 municipalities, 22 provincial teams and 5 autonomous regions. Further to this, the People's Liberation Army sent a team, and six sports association teams were entered (generally associations from specific industry groupings or large organisations).

Anhui
Beijing
Chongqing
Fujian
Gansu
Guangdong
Guangxi
Guizhou
Hainan
Hebei
Heilongjiang
Henan
Hong Kong
Hubei
Hunan
Jiangsu
Jiangxi
Jilin
Liaoning
Macau
Inner Mongolia
Ningxia
Qinghai
Shaanxi
Shandong
Shanghai
Shanxi
Sichuan
Tianjin
Tibet
Xinjiang
Yunnan
Zhejiang
Coal China Sports Association
Civil Defence and Police Sports Association
Finance Equestrian Sports Association
Locomotive Sports Association
People's Liberation Army
Xinjiang Production and Construction Corps

Medal table
Like the previous games, the medal table did not only include the medals obtained from the games, but also included the medals obtained during the Olympics and Asian Games.

See also
2008 National Winter Games of China

References

Medal tally

External links
Official website 
Results website 
Official Games handbook 
Coverage at Sina.com 

 
2013
2013 in multi-sport events
2013 in Chinese sport
Sport in Liaoning